Jesper Klein (13 November 1944 – 22 August 2011) was a Danish actor. He appeared in over 80 films and television shows since 1968. He starred in the 1969 film Ballad of Carl-Henning, which was entered into the 19th Berlin International Film Festival. Klein received the 1984Robert Award for Best Actor in a Leading Role for his role in Nils Malmros' Beauty and the Beast.

From 1970 to 2006 he was married to Lykke Nielsen, they have a son Sebastian. Lykke died in 2006. Jesper Klein died on August 22, 2011 after a short battle with cancer at the age of 66.

Selected filmography 
 Det kære legetøj (1968)
 Ballad of Carl-Henning (1969)
 Tough Guys of the Prairie (1970)
 Benny's Bathtub (1971)
 Gold for the Tough Guys of the Prairie (1971)
  (1971)
 Prince Piwi (1974)
 Trællene (1978)
 Beauty and the Beast (1983)
 The Man Who Wanted to Be Guilty (1990)
 The Great Day on the Beach (1991)
 Amazon Jack (1993)
 Frække Frida og de frygtløse spioner (1994)
 Amazon Jack 2: The Movie Star (1996)
 Circleen: City Mouse (1998)
 A Tale of Two Mozzies (2007)

Staff filmography 
  (1969) – Music Composer
  (1973) – Writer
  (1974) – Writer
 Ungdomsredaktionen (1975) – Writer
  (1980) – Writer, director
  (1985) – Writer
 Valhalla (1986) – Voice Director

References

External links 
 

1944 births
2011 deaths
Best Actor Bodil Award winners
Danish composers
Danish male film actors
Danish male voice actors
Danish male screenwriters
Deaths from cancer in Denmark
Deaths from liver cancer
Male television writers
People from Næstved
Danish voice directors
Best Actor Robert Award winners